Dibang may refer to the following places and people:

Dibang, an Indian journalist
Dibang River, India
Dibang Valley district in India
Dibang, Cameroon, a commune in Cameroon